Vice President of China may refer to:
 Vice President of the People's Republic of China
 Vice President of the Republic of China

See also
 President of China (disambiguation)